The Tuscan regional election of 2000 took place on 16 April 2000.

Electoral system
Regional elections in Tuscany were ruled by the "Tatarella law" (approved in 1995), which provided for a mixed electoral system: four fifths of the regional councilors were elected in provincial constituencies by proportional representation, using the largest remainder method with a droop quota and open lists, while the residual votes and the unassigned seats were grouped into a "single regional constituency", where the whole ratios and the highest remainders were divided with the Hare method among the provincial party lists; one fifth of the council seats instead was reserved for regional lists and assigned with a majoritarian system: the leader of the regional list that scored the highest number of votes was elected to the presidency of the Region while the other candidates were elected regional councilors.

A threshold of 3% had been established for the provincial lists, which, however, could still have entered the regional council if the regional list to which they were connected had scored at least 5% of valid votes.

The panachage was also allowed: the voter can indicate a candidate for the presidency but prefer a provincial list connected to another candidate.

Parties and candidates

Results
1999 European election marked a turning point in relations between Forza Italia and the Northern League. In fact, the assembly works in Parliament had highlighted a growing programmatic convergence between the two parties. And so, in view of the 2001 general election, Berlusconi and Umberto Bossi put aside the old, and even bloody quarrels, and formed a new coalition: the Pole for Freedoms, which found in the regional elections, also in Tuscany, its first test. So the center-right candidate, Altero Matteoli, an important figure on the national landscape, was sustained also by the Northern League, which in 1995 had sustained Chiti.

The combination of what were the major forces of regional politics, securing an appointment to Claudio Martini, which ensured stability of the Regional Cabinet that the new regulations wanted to coincide in term with the legislature. Democrats of the Left was confirmed as the largest party in the region with 36% of the vote, while Forza Italia was the second largest party with 20%. The Olive Tree, an alliance comprising several centre-left parties including the Italian People's Party, the Democrats of the Left, The Democrats, the Federation of the Greens and Party of Italian Communists, had a reconfirmation but lost votes.

Like 1995 election, Communist Refoundation Party run lonely with its candidate.

References

2000 elections in Italy
2000 regional election
April 2000 events in Europe
2000